Joyce Hyser (born December 20, 1957) is an American former actress. She is best known for her role in the 1985 cult classic Just One of the Guys and for her recurring role in L.A. Law. In 2012 Hyser turned her focus to writing and producing screenplays, and her last screen role was in 2014's The Wedding Pact.

Early life
Hyser was born in New York City. She is Jewish. Hyser grew up on the east coast and attended summer camp every year as a result of a charitable organization, The Jewish Federation of Greater Philadelphia. She credits her summer camp experiences with helping her to discover her talents and find the confidence she needed to pursue her dreams. Hyser studied acting in both New York City and Los Angeles.

Career
Hyser appeared in various films in the early 1980s, the last of which was the 1985 comedy Just One of the Guys. She then mainly guest-starred in television series, including a recurring role in L.A. Law as Jimmy Smits's girlfriend.

She was featured prominently in the music video for "I Can Dream About You" by Dan Hartman. She was also featured in the music video for the 1994 song "Pincushion" by ZZ Top, a single from their 1994 album Antenna.

Hyser has become a spokeswoman for the Harold Robinson Foundation, which provides a free summer camp for inner city and underprivileged children. In 2011, Hyser appeared in a small role in CSI: Crime Scene Investigation as a woman who masquerades as a man, a role she described as an homage to Just One of the Guys.

Personal life
For roughly four years in the 1980s, she was in a relationship with Bruce Springsteen, as discussed in the biography Bruce, by Peter Ames Carlin. Later that decade she dated, and subsequently lived with, Warren Beatty for a year and a half.

She is currently married to Jeff Robinson, owner of Canyon Creek Properties. Both are on the board of the Harold Robinson Foundation.

Filmography

Film

Television

References

External links

American film actresses
American television actresses
Living people
1957 births
21st-century American women